Slumdog Millionaire is a 2008 British romantic drama film directed by Danny Boyle and written by Simon Beaufoy. It stars Dev Patel, Freida Pinto, Madhur Mittal, Anil Kapoor, and Irrfan Khan. Based on Vikas Swarup's 2005 novel Q & A, the film focuses on an 18-year old game show contestant named Jamal Malik (Patel). After being accused of cheating on Kaun Banega Crorepati, the Indian version of Who Wants to Be a Millionaire?, he recounts to the police how events in his life story enabled him to answer every question correctly. A. R. Rahman composed the film's musical score, while Anthony Dod Mantle and Chris Dickens were the cinematographer and film editor, respectively.

The film premiered on 30 August 2008 at the Telluride Film Festival in Colorado. It was then shown at the 2008 Toronto International Film Festival where it won the Toronto International Film Festival People's Choice Award. Fox Searchlight gave the film a limited release in ten cinemas in the United States on 12 November 2008. The film was given a wide release in the United Kingdom on 9 January 2009 and the United States on 23 January. The film earned a worldwide box office total of more than $378 million. Rotten Tomatoes, a review aggregator, surveyed 289 reviews and judged 91% to be positive.

The film garnered several awards and nominations with particular praise for Boyle's direction, Beaufoy's screenplay, Rahman's score, Mantle's cinematography, and Dicken's editing. The film garnered ten nominations at the 81st Academy Awards, and went on to win eight awards, including Best Picture, Best Director (Boyle), and Best Adapted Screenplay (Beaufoy). At the 62nd British Academy Film Awards, the film earned eleven nominations and won eight awards, including Best Film, Best Director, and Best Adapted Screenplay. The film won all four categories it was nominated in at the 66th Golden Globe Awards, including Best Motion Picture – Drama and Best Director.

At the 20th Producers Guild of America Awards, Slumdog Millionaire won for Best Theatrical Motion Picture. Boyle won Outstanding Directing – Feature Film at the 61st Directors Guild of America Awards, and Beaufoy won Best Adapted Screenplay at the 61st Writers Guild of America Awards. At the 15th Screen Actors Guild Awards, the film's cast won the award for Outstanding Performance by a Cast in a Motion Picture. The film received six nominations at the 14th Critics' Choice Awards and won five awards including Best Picture. In addition, the National Board of Review named it the Best Film of 2008.

Accolades

See Also
2008 in film

Notes

References 
 General

 

 Specific

External links 
 

Lists of accolades by film
Awards